Potter Run is a tributary to Neshannock Creek in western Pennsylvania.  The stream rises in south-central Lawrence County and flows west and enters Neshannock Creek just downstream of Volant, Pennsylvania. The watershed is roughly 50% agricultural, 44% forested and the rest is other uses.

References

Rivers of Pennsylvania
Tributaries of the Beaver River
Rivers of Lawrence County, Pennsylvania